This article shows all participating team squads at the 2010 Final Four Women's Volleyball Cup, held from September 21 to September 25, 2010 in Chiapas, Mexico.

Head Coach: Horacio Bastit

Head Coach: Marcos Kwiek

Head Coach: José A. Bernal

Head Coach: Cheol Yong Kim

References

External links 
 NORCECA

F
F